Lisbon is the capital city of Portugal.

Lisbon may also refer to:

Places

Portugal 
Lisbon District, a district along the western coast

United States 
Lisbon, Connecticut, a New England town
Lisbon, Florida
Lisbon, Illinois
Lisbon, Indiana
Lisbon, Iowa
Lisbon, Louisiana
Lisbon, Maine, a New England town
Lisbon (CDP), Maine, within the town
Lisbon, Maryland
Lisbon, Missouri
Lisbon, New Hampshire, a New England town
Lisbon (CDP), New Hampshire, within the town
Lisbon, New York
Lisbon, North Dakota
Lisbon, Clark County, Ohio
Lisbon, Ohio (Columbiana County)
Lisbon, Juneau County, Wisconsin, a town
Lisbon, Waukesha County, Wisconsin, a town

Other uses
Lisbon (album), a 2010 album by the Walkmen
Lisbon (1956 film), a 1956 film by Ray Milland
Lisbon (1999 film), a 1999 Argentine-Spanish thriller
Grand Lisboa, a hotel in Macau, China
"Lisbon Antigua", the title song from the film Lisbon
Lisbon Treaty, signed by the EU member states on 13 December 2007, and entered into force on 1 December 2009
Lisbon Strategy, a central element of the European Union's economic strategy
Lisbon Convention, an international convention of the Council of Europe elaborated together with UNESCO
Lisbon Declaration, a treaty signed between countries of the European Union and the African Union
Lisbon Lions, Celtic FC squad of 1967
Teresa Lisbon, a fictional character on the American TV crime drama The Mentalist
Treaty of Lisbon, a treaty of the European Union
Lisbon, the first movement of Lincolnshire Posy
"Lisbon", an episode of the television series The Crown

See also
 Lisbon Township (disambiguation)
 New Lisbon (disambiguation)
 Lisburn